Luke Sellars (born May 21, 1981) is a Canadian former professional ice hockey player.

Biography
Sellars was born in Toronto. As a youth, he played in the 1995 Quebec International Pee-Wee Hockey Tournament with a minor ice hockey team from Wexford, Toronto.

Sellars was drafted 30th overall in the 1st round by the Atlanta Thrashers in 1999 NHL Entry Draft, one of the first two picks in Thrashers history after 1st overall pick Patrik Štefan. He played one game for the Thrashers during the 2001-02 NHL season.

Career statistics

References

External links

1981 births
Living people
Atlanta Thrashers draft picks
Atlanta Thrashers players
Canadian expatriate ice hockey players in Austria
Canadian expatriate ice hockey players in Denmark
Canadian expatriate ice hockey players in Finland
Canadian expatriate ice hockey players in Germany
Canadian ice hockey defencemen
Chicago Wolves players
Danbury Trashers players
Greenville Grrrowl players
HC TWK Innsbruck players
Iserlohn Roosters players
Jokipojat players
Ottawa 67's players
Rødovre Mighty Bulls players
Ice hockey people from Toronto
Fort Worth Brahmas players